John Wesley Johnson, nicknamed "Smoky", was a Negro league pitcher in the 1920s and 1930s.

Johnson attended Jarvis Christian College, and made his Negro leagues debut in 1922 with the Cleveland Tate Stars. He played for several teams, including the Lincoln Giants and Chicago American Giants, and finished his career with a two-year stint with the Memphis Red Sox in 1932 and 1933.

References

External links
 and Seamheads

Place of birth missing
Place of death missing
Year of birth missing
Year of death missing
Chicago American Giants players
Cleveland Browns (baseball) players
Cleveland Elites players
Cleveland Tate Stars players
Cleveland Tigers (baseball) players
Lincoln Giants players
Memphis Red Sox players
Baseball pitchers